Lehrberg is a market town in the district of Ansbach, Mittelfranken, Bavaria, Germany.

Villages
There are districts mentioned below:

References

External links

Ansbach (district)